Trần Đình Trọng (born 25 April 1997) is a Vietnamese professional footballer who plays as a defender for V.League 1 club Bình Định and the Vietnam national team.

Honours
Sài Gòn FC
V.League 2: 2015
Hà Nội
V.League 1: 2018, 2019; Runner-up: 2020  
Vietnamese National Cup: 2019, 2020
Vietnamese Super Cup: 2019, 2020, 2021 
Vietnam U23/Olympic
AFC U-23 Championship: Runner-up: 2018
Asian Games: Fourth place: 2018
VFF Cup: 2018
Vietnam 
AFF Championship: 2018
VFF Cup: 2022
King's Cup: Runner-up: 2019
Individual
AFF Championship Best Eleven: 2018

References

External links
 

1997 births
Living people
Vietnamese footballers
Association football central defenders
V.League 1 players
Saigon FC players
Sportspeople from Hanoi
Footballers at the 2018 Asian Games
Competitors at the 2017 Southeast Asian Games
Asian Games competitors for Vietnam
Vietnam international footballers
Southeast Asian Games competitors for Vietnam